The sixty-first Connecticut House of Representatives district elects one member of the Connecticut House of Representatives. Its current representative is a Republican Tami Zawistowski. She won a special election in the spring of 2014 to replace Democrat Elaine O'Brien who died while in office. The district consists of the entire towns of Suffield and East Granby, along with part of Windsor north of the Farmington River.

List of representatives

Recent elections

External links 
 Google Maps - Connecticut House Districts

References

61